The 30th Japan Record Awards were held on December 31, 1988, and were broadcast live on TBS.

Award winners 
Japan Record Award:
Hikaru Genji for "Paradise Ginga"
Best Vocalist:
Chiyoko Shimakura
Best New Artist:
Otokogumi
Best Album:
Kyosuke Himuro for "Flowers for Algernon"
Best international group:
BROS

External links
Official Website

Japan Record Awards
Japan Record Awards
Japan Record Awards
Japan Record Awards
1988